Sweet Sweet Sound is the first extended play from Sarah Reeves. Sparrow Records released the EP on April 21, 2009. Reeves worked with Matt Bronleewe, Ed Cash, Ian Eskelin, in the production of this album.

Critical reception

Indicating in a nine out of ten from Cross Rhythms, Stephen Luff says, "is the start of something very special." Ben Cardenas, rating the EP three and a half stars for Jesus Freak Hideout, writes, "She has extensive talent and is creative and true in her style." Awarding the EP four stars by New Release Today, Kevin Davis describes, "Great debut album...very impressed by Sarah’s singing and songwriting". Michael Dalton, giving the EP a four out of five at The Phantom Tollbooth, states, "This debut is well-crafted and appealing. It sounds modern and fresh."

Track listing

Chart performance

References

2009 EPs
Sparrow Records EPs
Albums produced by Matt Bronleewe